William Walker (18 January 1884 – 2 May 1945) was a Scottish footballer, who played for Rangers, Clyde, Reading, Clydebank, Fraserburgh and Scotland.

Honours 
Clyde
Scottish Cup: Runner-up 1909–10, 1911–12
Scottish Division Two: 1904–05
Runners-up: 1905–06
Glasgow Charity Cup: 1909–10
 Glasgow & West Shield: 1906–07

Clydebank
 Clydebank Charity Cup: 1917–18, 1918–19, 1919–20

Fraserburgh
 Aberdeenshire League: 1922–23
 Aberdeenshire Charity Cup: 1921–22

Scotland
British Home Championship: 1909–10
 Runner-up: 1908–09

References

Sources

External links

1884 births
Footballers from Glasgow
1945 deaths
Scottish footballers
Scotland international footballers
Rangers F.C. players
Clyde F.C. players
Reading F.C. players
Clydebank F.C. (1914) players
Fraserburgh F.C. players
Scottish Football League players
Scottish Football League representative players
Association football wing halves